Cadet College Petaro is a military boarding school in Jamshoro District of the southern province of Sindh in Pakistan; about 20 miles (32 km) from Hyderabad which is under administration of Pakistan Navy.

Its campus occupies over 700 acres (2.8 km2) on the west bank of the Indus River on the road from Hyderabad to Dadu, Larkana and Quetta.

Notable alumni
Asif Ali Zardari, former President of Pakistan and Co-Chairperson Pakistan Peoples Party (PPP)
Arbab Ghulam Rahim, former Chief Minister of Sindh
Liaquat Ali Jatoi, former Federal Minister of Industries and former Chief Minister of Sindh
Zulfiqar Mirza, former Sindh Home Minister, Member of Sindh Provincial Assembly
Rizwan Ahmed, Federal Secretary to Government of Pakistan
Maroof Afzal, Federal Secretary to Government of Pakistan
Khan Hasham bin Saddique, Vice Chief of Naval Staff (VCNS)
Syed Arifullah Hussaini, Commander Pakistan Fleet
Allah Dino Khawaja, senior PSP officer
Nouraiz Shakoor, former Federal Minister, Govt of Pakistan
Karim Ahmed Khawaja, former senator, Govt of Pakistan
Younus Changezi, former Balochistan Minister of Forests and Environment
Masood Sharif Khan Khattak, former Director General of the Intelligence Bureau of Pakistan (DGIB)
Zaka Ashraf, former President Zarai Taraqqiati Bank, and former Chairman Pakistan Cricket Board
Shahid Iqbal, Chief of Staff (COS), Ex-DCNS (T&P), COMPAK, DCNS (O) and Commander CTF-150

History
The college was founded in August 1957 at Mirpurkhas, Sindh as a residential institution. The first batch of teachers joined the college on 5 August 1957 at Mirpurkhas while the college building was still under preparation. These five teachers were Mr. Abdullah Khadim Hussain, Mr. Feroz Yusuf Khan, Mr. Aziz Ahmed Farooqui, Mr. Hasan Masud Zuberi, and Mr. Syed Zahoorul Hasan. While the government had advertised for the position of Principal of the college, Mr. Mohammed Hasnain was appointed as the in Charge (Acting) Principal on 25 August 1957 for the initial few months. He was soon succeeded by Col.(retd) J.H.H. Coombes on 20 March 1958. The first batch of 30 students joined the college on 27 August 1957 in class VIII.

In 1958, a new site was sought in order to build a permanent campus for the college. A site was chosen at Petaro, a few miles up the river from Jamshoro. The construction of a purpose built campus began almost immediately. Mr. Habib-ur-Rehman, Minister of Education, laid the foundation stone of the college on 16 January 1959. The initial cost of construction of the buildings of the college sanctioned by the government of West Pakistan was Rs. 2,700,000. The college finally moved to its new premises at Petaro in August 1959. At the time of the move, the River Indus was in flood, and Petaro was also submerged under its waters. The building in Mirpurkhas that originally housed Cadet College Petaro was given over to the Government College Mirpurkhas.

The first principal of the college was Col.(retd) J.H.H. Coombes who retired from the college in 1965. He was followed by Cdr.(retd) Firoz Shah, who remained in charge until 1972. The previous principal was Cdre. M. Abid Saleem (2000–2007). The present principal is Cdre. Mehboob Ellahi Malik (2014-onwards).

The college is a residential institution for over 900 full-time students at present, providing education from Class 8 to Class 12 (Intermediate). At the time it was first constructed, it was designed to accommodate only 360 students in four houses (or hostels). The capacity was expanded to 570 with the construction of two more houses in the late 1960s.

The year 2007 marked the fiftieth anniversary of the college. Gen. Pervez Musharraf, President of Pakistan was the chief guest at the Golden Jubilee celebrations on 28 February 2007. On this occasion, President Musharraf announced the formation of a university in the vicinity of the college that will be sponsored by the Metupak Foundation.

Academics
The main body of students is admitted each year to Class 8. Until the academic year 1998–99, the college used to admit a small contingent of boys from the rural districts of Sindh to Class 7, to prepare them for competitive success with the new entry into Class 8. However, it was decided by the Board of Governors of the college to discontinue Class 7 from 1999 onwards. All Class 7 Cadets stayed in Shahbaz House. Shahbaz house became a full-fledge house in 2000; having a similar strength of all Classes like the other houses, and started participating in all Inter-House competitions to compete for the Championship.

College students have normally secured most of the top positions in the competitive Hyderabad Board of Intermediate and Secondary Education examinations every year. Further, the first batch of O-levels brought a fruitful result by bringing 4 A*, 33 As and 20 Bs in May/June CIE O-Level Examinations 2012 under the supervision of the O-levels co-ordinator and House Master 'Sachal House' Mr. Ahsan Ali Shah.

Houses
The college is subdivided into eight (08) houses.

 The house is currently Champion

 The house is currently Runner-Up

 The house homes the First Champions Trophy

Shahbaz House was created in as an entity in 1965, but a proper building for the house was constructed the year 1975. This was meant to be solely to house Class 7 cadets, to prepare them to become proper regular cadets a year later. This concept was developed to give opportunity to boys from underdeveloped rural areas. However, due to malpractices by college administration in later years, many sons of rich landlords availed this opportunity as they were unable to get in through competitive examinations. Therefore, in the year 2000, the Board of Governors decided to abolish this scheme as it did not benefit the segment of the population it was intended for. Shahbaz House was declared a regular house with cadets from all classes henceforth.

In 2007, on the occasion of Cadet College Petaro's golden jubilee, General Pervez Musharraf, who was the chief guest on the occasion, announced the construction of a new house, which was named Sachal Sarmast House after the famous Sufi poet from Sindh.

Campus
The campus is founded near the town Petaro, which is part of the District Jamshoro. The campus is practically a small township with its own electricity, water supply, sewerage, security and other infrastructure. The campus is divided into 4 parts, which are Staff Quarters, Cadets Area, Sports Grounds and College Premises. The college also has a parade ground, which hosts the Adjutant Parade and Principal Parade.

Administration
The college is governed by an autonomous board of governors, headed by the Commander Karachi (COMKAR) of the Pakistan Navy as its chairman. Since 1975, the principal of the college has been an officer of the Pakistan Navy as well. The adjutants have been either from Pakistan Army (1957-1970 and 2010 onwards) or Pakistan Navy (1970-2010)

Staff infrastructure
The college is controlled and patronised by the Pakistan Navy. Since 1975, the Principal posted is at least of the rank of a serving Captain of the Navy with experience of administration. His tenure is normally for 3 years. Likewise the Pakistan Navy provides an Adjutant of the rank of Lieutenant / Lieutenant Commander and other training staff like Chief Petty Officers, Petty Officers and Sailors for military training of the cadets. The current Adjutant of the college is 
Lieutenant Shuhab Ali, Pakistan Navy, he is from Pak Marines branch of Navy. He is an ex-cadet of the same college with kit no: 200-2051 (L)

The college is staffed by 41 teachers (professors, assistant professors and lecturers) who have at least a master's degree. There are other officers like the medical officer, administrative officer, bursar, librarian and office superintendent. In addition, there are around 215 board employees and over 400 college employees.

The Petarian Association (TPA)

Founded in 1982, the Petarian Association has become the focal point of gathering for all Petarians, particularly those in Pakistan. The association is a successor of the Petaro Old Boys Association (POBA) that existed informally for a few years in the late 1960s, and then became defunct. The Petarian Association was registered under the Societies Registration Act-XXI of 1860 on 4 February 1982 under registration no. KAR-7210.

Over these years, the association has hosted numerous functions that provide a social meeting ground for the Petarians and their families. The association presently has over 900 life members.

The Commander Karachi (COMKAR) of the Pakistan Navy (who is the Chairman Board of Governors of Cadet College Petaro) has always been invited to be the Patron-in-Chief of the association. The principal of Cadet College Petaro is the patron of the association.

References

External links
Official Website
Comprehensive website with archives of Cadet College Petaro history

 
Cadet colleges in Pakistan
Schools in Hyderabad, Sindh
Military in Sindh
Boarding schools in Pakistan
Pakistan Navy